Distinguished Professor is an academic title given to some top tenured professors in a university, school, or department. Some distinguished professors may have endowed chairs.

In the United States
Often specific to one institution, titles such as "president's professor", "university professor", "distinguished professor", "distinguished research professor", "distinguished teaching professor", "distinguished university professor", or "regents professor" are granted to a small percentage of the top tenured faculty who are regarded as particularly important in their respective fields of research. Some institutions grant more university-specific, formal titles such as M.I.T.'s "Institute Professor", Yale University's "Sterling Professor", or Duke University's "James B. Duke Professor".

Some academic and/or scholarly organizations may also bestow the title "distinguished professor" in recognition of achievement over the course of an academic career. For example, the Association of Collegiate Schools of Architecture annually recognizes up to five faculty members at architecture schools in the United States and Canada with the ACSA Distinguished Professor Award.

References

Academic ranks
Professorships
Distinguished professors